(born April 29, 1977) is a Japanese actress. She starred in a film Kura (storage) for which she garnered the Newcomer of the Year award of the Japanese Academy and a TV program, Futari (two).

External links

1977 births
Living people
Japanese film actresses
Place of birth missing (living people)
Japanese television actresses